Keeping up with the Joneses is an Australian reality television series that follows the life of a family on a cattle station—Coolibah Station—600 km south-west of Darwin, Northern Territory. The show follows the daily lives of the titular Jones family—father Milton and mother Cristina—and their staff as they muster cattle with helicopters, fight fires, battle floods and even wrestle crocodiles. This raw and humorous snapshot of family life shows what it takes to live in the outback. The family own over 1,000,000 acres.

References

Network 10 original programming
2010s Australian reality television series
2010 Australian television series debuts
2011 Australian television series endings
Television shows set in the Northern Territory
Television shows set in the Outback